Karl Borromäus Maria Heinrich Graf von Spreti (21 May 1907 – 5 April 1970) was a German diplomat. He is best known as the West German Ambassador  to Guatemala from 1968 until his assassination in 1970. The story of his assassination by Guatemalan guerillas was depicted in a 1970 book, Why Karl von Spreti Died, by Ryszard Kapuściński.

Background
Spreti was born in the Kapfing Castle near Landshut to an aristocratic family (his direct ancestor was Leo von Klenze). Like his forefather, Karl von Spreti studied architecture. He also joined the Bavarian People's Party. After his service in the Second World War German Army and a short period in Allied captivity, he settled in Lindau, where he continued his career as an architect and as a local politician for the Christian Social Union of Bavaria.

In 1956, Spreti became West Germany's first ambassador to Luxembourg since the Second World War, and held that post until 1960, when he became the ambassador to Cuba (until 1963), then to Jordan (1963–1965) and to the Dominican Republic (between 1966 and 1968). Finally he was dispatched to Guatemala during the turbulent times of the Guatemalan Civil War. On 31 March 1970 he was kidnapped by Marxist–Leninist FAR guerillas in Guatemala City and was murdered six days later. West Germany immediately severed diplomatic ties with Guatemala. Three days after Spreti's murder, an anti-communist death squad named Mano Blanca retaliated by assassinating the Communist politician César Montenegro Paniagua.

See also
List of kidnappings
List of solved missing person cases

References

Further references
Blumenau, Bernhard. The United Nations and Terrorism. Germany, Multilateralism, and Antiterrorism Efforts in the 1970s. Basingstoke: Palgrave Macmillan, 2014, ch. 2. .
 Katrin Neuhaus: Un error de cálculo. El secuestro y asesinato del Embajador Karl Graf von Spreti a la luz de nuevas fuentes documentales. Guatemala, 2018. Ziviler Friedensdienst, GIZ. https://www.ziviler-friedensdienst.org/de/publikation/un-error-de-calculo

External links
 

1907 births
1970 deaths
1970s missing person cases
20th-century German diplomats
Ambassadors of West Germany to the Dominican Republic
Ambassadors of West Germany to Guatemala
Ambassadors of West Germany to Luxembourg
Ambassadors of West Germany to Jordan
Assassinated German diplomats
Assassinated German people
German people murdered abroad
German people taken hostage
German terrorism victims
Kidnapped diplomats
Kidnapped German people
Missing person cases in Guatemala
People murdered in Guatemala
Terrorism deaths in Guatemala